Below is a list of events affecting Japanese television in 2022.

Events

Ongoing

New series and returning shows

Ending

Sports Events

Special events and milestone episodes

Deaths

See also 
2022 in British television
2022 in Philippine television
2022 in television

References 

2022 in Japanese television